The Unicorn Trend is type of fad in which there is a tendency to design, produce and use consumer objects adorned with a rainbow and/or vibrant color palette, typically composed of  pastel or highly saturated colors such as pink, violet, blue and green. This tendency has gained in popularity since 2016, especially among millennials. Some in this generation associate the unicorn with a return to childhood and an escape from reality. Its popularity was also augmented by the influencer and celebrity economy of social networks. Examples of consumer products that might be adorned with this trend are:  phone cases, water bottles, tote bags, makeup and food.

The unicorn trend is part of a larger, contemporary kitschy aesthetic that has been broadly used to appeal to people who like posting on social networks with an eye to receiving social media engagement recognition reward such as 'likes.'

Trend development  
The unicorn has had an aesthetic and commercial value for centuries. The first written references to these animals dates back to the 4th Century BCE. Later on, the Unicorn became a popular folklore figure, symbols of chastity and purity, as they could only be captured by a virgin. 

Since the ancient Greeks, the unicorn was pictured in the mythology as an elegant beast similar to a white horse with a long and spiraling horn projecting from its forehead. The unicorn briefly appears even in the Old Testament of the Bible under the name of re’em (also reem, Hebrew: רְאֵם), making its way in the Western art and culture during the Medieval and Renaissance Ages.

Over time the unicorn was re-imagined as a toy, characterised by pastel bright colours and sparkly eyes that were popular among young girls during the 1980s.

Contemporary consumption 
The physical perception of the unicorn has evolved during the years from a white, pure and elegant horse (as portrayed for example in the film Harry Potter and the Philosopher's Stone) to the sparkly and colorful creatures of the media franchise My Little Pony.

The start of the trend 
Health food photographer Adeline Waugh unintentionally started the unicorn food trend in June 2016. As a food blogger she liked experimenting with cream cheese and natural pigments on toasts, which is how she came up with a pastel-coloured cream to decorate her toasts. Her followers appreciated the experiment and started calling it "unicorn toast". This was followed by unicorn lattes, cakes, hot chocolate, etc. The trend developed further as the colour scheme was used a variety of products, mainly beauty products. Marketers soon recognised the power of this fad and started exploiting it for commercial purposes, Starbucks for example launched a unicorn Frappuccino in 2017 and really contributed to the boom of the unicorn fad. The LGBT community also started to embrace this unicorn fever, as its colors are reminiscent of the community’s signature flag.

As Vaughn Scribner points out this infatuation with unicorns is not new, however, with social media it has been spreading on a much wider scale. In 2016, it became a whole cultural phenomenon. The trend expert Daniel Levine helped explaining why the unicorn mania became a fad. According to Levine three are the key points that create a fad: "an established cultural interest in something that combines with the current zeitgeist", "publicity by celebrities" and "a high visual interest that gets the attention on social media".

Part of the reason why unicorns are so beloved is that they remind us of our childhood, and they help people escape from reality. Just like creatures such as vampires or werewolves were popular when times were more joyful, unicorns became popular during a time when politics and culture were dark and oppressive.

Unicorns are also connected to the millennials nostalgia, which is evident everywhere on social media platforms. The unicorn reminds many of their carefree and happy childhood. In 2010, the TV cartoon My Little Pony: Friendship Is Magic played a big role in that, it draws on the My Little Pony franchise of the 1980s. The Unicorn mania can also be linked to Lisa Frank, the founder of the a school supply company called Lisa Frank Incorporated. It sold a lot of school supply and stickers characterised by colourful and neon colours. Lisa Frank, like My Little Pony, had a strong impact on kids that are now millennials.

The Unicorn Fad 
According to Google Trend, the global search of the term unicorn reached its highest point during April 2017 when Starbucks launched its Unicorn Frappuccino. From August 2016 through July 2017 searches on Pinterest for unicorn food saw an increase of nearly 400%. While those for unicorn makeup reached more than 460%. On Instagram, the hashtag unicorn has amassed more than 5.9 million posts. Since then, the search interest has dropped off during 2018. New fads have taken over the unicorn fever, like the mermaid trend for example.

For this reason, more than a trend it could be referred to as a fad. Even if sometimes the two terms are used interchangeably, they differ in their rise, incubation period and duration. The trend rises slowly and is driven by a functional need, a fad is an ephemeral and emotional necessity to purchase that rises from a sudden hype towards something. Therefore, it rises as quickly as it disappears.

Subcategories of the trend

Unicorn food 

The term "Unicorn food" often refers to the use of colorful or sparkly food items in dishes rather than the appearance of a unicorn figure.

The Unicorn Frappuccino consisted in a purple color-changing drink with some blue tones and with a sweet and a fruity dominant taste. Since then, any kind of food, from sweet to savory recipes, has started to take the shape of a pastel colored unicorn. Food bloggers, writers, YouTubers, celebrities, and ordinary people created recipes and applied them to various kind of foods. There are books, blogs, YouTube videos, and websites dedicated to the reproduction and the purchase of sparkly and colorful ingredients and meals.

Many different types of food were adapted to the unicorn style: biscuits, yogurt bowls, cakes fudges, milkshakes, cupcakes, ice-creams, marshmallows, meringues, banana breads, doughs, popcorn, sushi, noodles, soups, sandwiches, grilled cheese, pizza.

Unicorn beauty 
The Unicorn beauty trend involves the use of pastel colors (soft pink, green, blue and lavender), holographic shades, glitters and unicorn horn-shaped objects for makeup, nail art, and hairstyling.

It is believed that the trend entered the beauty industry around 2008 when an online vegan and cruelty-free brand for makeup and hair color (Lime Crime) was founded and used the tagline "Makeup for Unicorns" to commercialize its rainbowed products. In 2014, the hair colorist and youtuber, Guy Tang, shared a series of photos on Instagram with a unicorn-colored hairstyle, that made him popular worldwide.

By 2017, the unicorn trend had spread into the beauty world thanks to social media platforms such as Instagram, YouTube and Pinterest and partly overtook its counterpart, the Mermaid Trend. In the same year, Lisa Frank made a collaboration with the brand Glamour Dolls Makeup and released a cruelty-free makeup collection with the packaging covered by her iconic rainbowed animal prints.

In 2018, Paris Hilton launched a skincare line, starting with the release of a limited edition rose water named "Unicorn Mist". In 2019, during the National Unicorn Day (celebrated on April 9 in the U.S.), Paris Hilton announced on social media the re-release of the sold-out product.

Thanks to the popularity of this trend in this sector, products labelled as "unicorn snot" (holographic glitter body gel), "unicorn tears" (lipsticks and lip-glosses) and "unicorn essence" (serum for the skin) are offered in the market.

Some beauty products related to this trend are: unicorn-inspired highlighters, eye palettes, lipsticks, nail polish, soaps, unicorn horn makeup brushes and hairstyles.

Unicorn design 
The Unicorn Trend has effected the world of design with the creation of some daily use objects and gadgets with the appearance and colors of unicorns. The designs are often found on pillows, sheets and bed-covers, drinking cups, and flatware. One of the most popular items was the unicorn pool float, an inflatable plastic unicorn.

The Unicorn Trend has spilled over so fast and so deeply that during the Design Week 2019 in Milan, the city also decided to set up the Unicorn House for three days. It was a real house organized by Booking.com with an internal design that reminded the mythological animal with various decorations like on stars, rainbows, magical horns, colorful clouds and pastel shades.

Furthermore, there are many other locations around the globe that follow this unicorn theme like cafés, swimming pools, amusement parks.

Unicorn fashion 
Rapidly the popularity of unicorn-themed objects also reached the fashion industry. Clothes, shoes and accessories were involved, but also phone covers and tattoos. Materials such as sheer fabrics and fake fur started to be used more frequently associated with rainbow or pastel colors and unicorn images.

In 2016, actress Margot Robbie wore an Alexander McQueen gown adorned with a gold sequin unicorn to the premiere of the film Suicide Squad. During the 2017, Milan Fashion Week, Moschino unveiled a capsule collection in collaboration with the 80s children toy brand "My Little Pony". Models were parading on the runway clothed with bubble-gum pink and baby blue looks displaying the toys' graphic. During the 2018, Paris Fashion Week, American designer Thom Browne ended his show with a model walking out on the runway having a unicorn on leash. The unicorn consisted of two male models wearing an elaborate white tulle costume coordinated with the look of the model.

See also 
 Fad
 Influencer
 Unicorn
 Unicorn Food
 Unicorn Frappuccino
 My Little Pony
 LGBT
 Rainbow
 Seapunk

References

External links 
Barrett, Jessica. "The Unicorn Trend is a Perfect Nexus of Awfulness", iNews,  27 April 2017

Works about unicorns
2010s fads and trends
Cultural trends